Mr. Machinery Operator is the fifth and final studio album by the American alternative rock band Firehose. It is also their second album to be released on the major label, Columbia Records.

Reception
Entertainment Weekly gave the album a B- and called it "agreeably sedate." Robert Christgau called the album a dud.

Track listing 
 "Formal Introduction" (Raymond Pettibon/Mike Watt)
 "Blaze" (Ed Crawford)
 "Herded into Pools" (Watt)
 "Witness" (George Hurley/Crawford)
 "Number Seven" (Kira Roessler)
 "Powerful Hankerin'" (Pettibon/Watt)
 "Rocket Sled/Fuel Tank" (Watt)
 "Quicksand" (Chip and Tony Kinman)
 "Disciples of the 3-Way" (Watt)
 "More Famous Quotes" (Watt)
 "Sincerely" (Roessler/Watt)
 "Hell-Hole" (Hurley/Crawford)
 "4. 29. 92" (Watt)
 "The Cliffs Thrown Down" (Watt)

Personnel
fIREHOSE
 Mike Watt: bass guitar and vocals 
 Ed Crawford: guitar and vocals
 George Hurley: drums, bongos, percussion
guests
 J. Mascis: additional guitars and bass guitars
 Joe Baiza, Nels Cline, Mac McCaughan: additional guitars
 Freda Rentie: additional vocals
 David Kahne: Hammond organ

References

1993 albums
Firehose (band) albums
Columbia Records albums